An isidium is a vegetative reproductive structure present in some lichens. Isidia are outgrowths of the thallus surface, and are corticated (i.e., containing the outermost layer of the thallus), usually with a columnar structure, and consisting of both fungal hyphae (the mycobiont) and algal cells (the photobiont). They are fragile structures and may break off and be distributed by wind, animals, and splashing raindrops. In terms of structure, isidia may be described as warty, cylindrical, clavate (club-shaped), scale-like, coralloid (coral-shaped), simple, or branched.

Examples of isidiate lichens include members of the genera Parmotrema and Peltigera.

See also

Soredium

References

External links
Ascomycetes glossary

Lichenology
Fungal morphology and anatomy